The U18 New Brunswick Curling Championships is the provincial under-18 men's and women's curling championship for New Brunswick, run by the New Brunswick Curling Association. The winning team each year represents New Brunswick at the Canadian U18 Curling Championships.

Past Champions

Men

Women

Notes

References

Curling competitions in New Brunswick
Canadian U18 Curling Championships